In enzymology, a thiamine oxidase is an enzyme that catalyzes the chemical reaction

thiamine + 2 O2 + H2O  thiamine acetic acid + 2 H2O2

The 3 substrates of this enzyme are thiamine, O2, and H2O, whereas its two products are thiamine acetic acid and H2O2.

This enzyme belongs to the family of oxidoreductases, specifically those acting on the CH-OH group of donor with oxygen as acceptor.  The systematic name of this enzyme class is thiamine:oxygen 5-oxidoreductase. Other names in common use include thiamin dehydrogenase, thiamine dehydrogenase, and thiamin:oxygen 5-oxidoreductase.  This enzyme participates in thiamine metabolism.  It employs one cofactor, FAD.

References

 
 
 

EC 1.1.3
Flavoproteins
Enzymes of unknown structure